Moffatt Benjamin Oxenbould  (born 18 November 1943) is an Australian opera director.

The Sydney-born Oxenbould was Artistic Director of Opera Australia from 1984 until his retirement in 1999. He had been part of the company since he graduated from the National Institute of Dramatic Art in 1962. Since his retirement he still directs with Opera Australia and Houston Grand Opera, and was a presenter with the classical music radio station ABC Classic FM.

He was made a Member of the Order of Australia in 1985 for his services to Opera.

In 2005 he released his memoirs Timing is Everything, describing his 37 years in opera in Australia.

References

External links
 
 Moffatt Oxenbould – c.1997 portrait photograph, National Portrait Gallery, Australia

Members of the Order of Australia
Musicians from Sydney
Australian opera directors
Classical music radio presenters
Living people
1943 births